John "Spud" McConnell (born November 13, 1958) is an American actor and television/radio personality based in New Orleans, Louisiana. He is married to actor/producer Maureen Brennan.

McConnell is a character actor who has appeared in more than 40 films, ranging from obscure independent films (mostly filmed locally in New Orleans, or elsewhere set in  the Gulf Coast region) to major cinematic release movies such as O Brother, Where Art Thou?, Django Unchained, 12 Years a Slave, and Interview with the Vampire.  McConnell has also appeared in numerous plays, including an off-Broadway run in the one-man show The Kingfish, wherein he portrays colorful Louisiana Governor Huey P. Long.  He is perhaps best known for having portrayed Ignatius J. Reilly from the Pulitzer Prize-winning novel A Confederacy of Dunces, and in that role was the model for a life-sized bronze statue of the fictitious character on historic Canal Street in downtown New Orleans.

On television, McConnell has had recurring roles in several series, among them Underground and Hap & Leonard. He also made several appearances over three seasons of Roseanne, with good friend and colleague John Goodman.  McConnell was also featured in a recurring role on the FX series The Riches, and on the HBO series Treme as a (fictional) disc jockey at (real life) radio station WWOZ.

For 11 years McConnell was the #1 afternoon radio personality in the Gulf South, hosting a daily call-in talk show, "The Spud Show", on WWL 870 AM and 105.3 FM.

In early 2019, McConnell began hosting the morning drive show on KKND (FM). Like his earlier show on WWL, it was also called "The Spud Show" but featured music, in the station's classic hits format, and less politics and talk.  On September 8, 2020, KKND switched to hot adult contemporary and dropped McConnell's morning show.

Filmography

Film

Television

Stage

References

External links

Official Web Site

1958 births
American male film actors
American male television actors
Living people
Male actors from Baton Rouge, Louisiana
Male actors from New Orleans